Vanity Lair is a reality television programme on Channel 4 in the United Kingdom. The series began on 3 February 2008 and is presented by Alexa Chung.

The shows aim is to discover what being beautiful really is. The format involves ten pre-selected "beautiful people" living in a mansion called 'Vanity Lair'. Each week three new arrivals compete for a place in the lair. The three new arrivals are immediately faced with the ten lairmates and asked a series of questions, the lairmates then decide which of the three to eliminate. The remaining two new arrivals then spend the rest of the week living in the mansion. At the end of the week the lairmates then vote on who they believe to be the most attractive of the new arrivals, the person scoring lowest is sent home. The new arrival scoring highest wins a place in 'Vanity Lair', however they then have to decide which of the current lairmates to eliminate, as there is only room for ten lairmates at any one time. In addition to this all contestants face a series of 'experiments throughout their stay in the lair.

The First series finished with an extended season finale on 6 April 2008, with a double episode.

Lairmates
In the order they sit in the judgement room:

 The lairmate who was replaced by the new arrival
 The new arrival chosen to join the lair
 The new arrival  voted the least attractive and eliminated at final judging
 The new arrival eliminated on first impressions
 The new arrival quit the competition
 The winner of Vanity Lair

References

2008 British television series debuts
2008 British television series endings
British reality television series
Television series by Endemol